Vogelsberg may refer to:

 The Vogelsberg, a major mountain region in central Germany
 Vogelsberg, Thuringia, a small village in Thuringia, Germany